The 49th Annual American Music Awards were held on November 21, 2021, at the Microsoft Theater in Los Angeles, recognizing the most popular artists, singles and albums of 2021. Cardi B hosted the ceremony, following Queen Latifah (1995) as the only female rappers in history to do so. Cardi B became the first artist to win Favorite Rap/Hip Hop Song three times. BTS, Doja Cat, and Megan Thee Stallion won three awards each.

The ceremony was notable as the first produced under the banner of MRC Live & Alternative, which was formerly known as Dick Clark Productions after use of that name was phased out the month before. However, this would turn out to be the only year produced under this banner, as the Dick Clark Productions name was restored in August 2022.

Performances

Notes
  Pre-recorded from Nashville, Tennessee
  Pre-recorded from Tennessee State University
  Megan Thee Stallion was originally planning to perform with BTS on "Butter", but pulled out "due to an unexpected personal matter".

Presenters
Presenters were announced on November 19, 2021.

 Cardi B – main show host
 Billy Porter – presented Latin Album
 Ansel Elgort & Rachel Zegler – presented Favorite Artist – Rock
 Michelle Young – "coming up"
 JoJo Siwa – presented Pop Duo/Group
 Diplo – "coming up" (multiple segments)
 Brandy – presented Pop Album
 Marsai Martin – presented Favorite Song – Hip-Hop
 D-Nice – introduced performance by Chlöe
 JB Smoove – presented Favorite Song – Pop
 Madelyn Cline – presented Favorite Trending Song
 Liza Koshy – presented Artist of the Year
 Anthony Ramos – presented Favorite Female Artist – Latin
 Machine Gun Kelly – presented New Artist of the Year
 Winnie Harlow – introduced performance by Zoe Wees

Winners and nominees 
The nominations were announced on ABC's Good Morning America, Spotify's morning show "The Get Up", and also via the American Music Awards Twitter account on October 28, 2021. Olivia Rodrigo received the most nominations with seven, followed by the Weeknd with six, and Bad Bunny, Doja Cat and Giveon with five each. BTS became the first Asian artist to receive Artist of the Year at the American Music Awards. Three new categories were introduced in 2021: Favorite Trending Song, Favorite Latin Duo or Group, and Favorite Gospel Artist.

Additionally, it was announced towards the end of October that though country singer Morgan Wallen had two nominations, due to his personal conduct in 2020 and 2021 which saw his music removed from further publicity and the suspension of his recording contract, he was not allowed to attend the ceremony or accept any awards won remotely. The show's production company plans to evaluate his future conduct in including him in future ceremonies.

Winners are listed first and highlighted in bold.

References 

2021 awards in the United States
2021 in Los Angeles
2021 music awards
American Music Awards